The Suffolk News-Herald is a newspaper serving Suffolk, Virginia, United States. The News-Herald is published twice a week on Wednesdays and Sundays, and is available free at newsstands and businesses throughout Suffolk and surrounding areas. It is owned by Suffolk Publications LLC.

External links 
 

Daily newspapers published in Virginia
Suffolk, Virginia
Free daily newspapers
Publications established in 1873